The Beijing Hualian Group (using the trademark BHG) is a leading Chinese retailer founded in 1998, headquartered in Beijing. It is one of the fifteen large national retail enterprises supported by the Ministry of Commerce and the only Chinese retail enterprise member of the International Department Store Association. Headed by Ji Xiao An the chairman of the board of the Beijing Hualian Group, the group's main activities include the operation of supermarkets and department stores, as well as the sale of general merchandise, textiles, daily-use products and fresh fruits and vegetables. The group has been a member of the International Association of department stores since 2006.

Brands
BHG Lifestyle Market
BHG Market Place
BHG Mall
SKP

Singapore
In Singapore, it acquired Seiyu Group's three existing department stores such as Bugis Junction, Lot One and Junction 8 and has since renamed its stores to BHG Singapore from April 5, 2007.

BHG had opened its second outlet in Century Square in December 2007 after the previous tenant Metro moved out, although it was closed down on 13 August 2017. It was being replaced by new generation of stores.

As of 2022, BHG was located in the following locations:

 Bugis Junction (Flagship)
 Lot One
 Junction 8

On 3 January 2022, BHG Raffles City was closed down after a temporary lease called One Assembly, which occupies the space previously occupied by Robinsons after the closure in December 2020. Also, BHG opened one store in Jurong Point on 1 September 2016, but had eventually closed down on 13 February 2022 citing COVID-19 losses. BHG Clementi Mall had closed down on 6 March 2022 as well.

References

External links
 Beijing Hualian Group 

Government-owned companies of China
Companies based in Beijing
Retail companies established in 1998
Retail companies of China
Supermarkets of China
Chinese brands